Sodium channel protein type 1 subunit alpha (SCN1A), is a protein which in humans is encoded by the SCN1A gene.

Gene location

The SCN1A gene is located on chromosome 2 of humans, and is made up of 26 exons spanning a total length of 6030 nucleotide base pairs (bp). Alternative splicing of exon 5 gives rise to two alternate exons. The promoter has been identified 2.5 kilobase pairs (kb) upstream of the transcription start site, and the 5'- untranslated exons may enhance expression of the SCN1A gene in SH-SY5Y cells, a human cell line derived from a neuroblastoma.

Function 

The vertebrate sodium channel is a voltage-gated ion channel essential for the generation and propagation of action potentials, chiefly in nerve and muscle. Voltage-sensitive sodium channels are heteromeric complexes consisting of a large central pore-forming glycosylated alpha subunit and 2 smaller auxiliary beta subunits. Functional studies have indicated that the transmembrane alpha subunit of the brain sodium channels is sufficient for expression of functional sodium channels. Brain sodium channel alpha subunits form a gene subfamily with several structurally distinct isoforms clustering on chromosome 2q24, types I, II (Nav1.2), and III (Nav1.3). There are also several distinct sodium channel alpha subunit isoforms in skeletal and cardiac muscle (Nav1.4 and Nav1.5, respectively).

The SCN1A gene codes for the alpha subunit of the voltage-gated sodium ion channel making it a member of ten paralogous gene families which code for the voltage-gated sodium transmembrane proteins NaV1.1. Within the family of genes which code for other portions of voltage-gated sodium channels, the SCN1A mutations were the first identified, since mutations to this gene caused epilepsy and febrile seizures. Indeed, the SCN1A gene is one of the most commonly mutated genes in the human genome associated with epilepsy, which has given it the title of a 'super culprit gene'. There are 900 distinct mutations reported for the SCN1A gene, approximately half of the reported mutations are truncations which result in no protein. The remaining half of mutations are missense mutations, which are predicted to either cause loss-of-function or gain-of-function, though very few have been tested for functionality in the lab.

Subtle differences in voltage-gated sodium ion channels can have devastating physiological effects and underlie abnormal neurological functioning. Mutations to the SCN1A gene most often result in different forms of seizure disorders, the most common forms of seizure disorders are Dravet Syndrome (DS), Intractable childhood epilepsy with generalized tonic-clonic seizures (ICEGTC), and severe myoclonic epilepsy borderline (SMEB). Clinically, 70-80% of patients with DS have identified mutations specific to the SCN1A gene, which are caused by de novo heterozygous mutations of the SCN1A gene. There are currently two databases on SCN1A mutations, Infobase and the SCN1A variant database.

Mice with knock-in SCN1A mutations, who are model organisms for DS quickly develop seizures, indicative of a significant reduction in the function of NaV1.1. It has been hypothesized that reduced sodium currents due to NaV1.1 mutations may cause hypoexcitability in GABAergic inhibitory interneurons leading to epilepsy. Mice in both the homozygous and heterozygous states develop the seizure phenotype and ataxia. Though homozygous mice die on average during the second to third week of life and approximately 50% of heterozygous null mice survive into adulthood.

Clinical significance 

Mutations in the SCN1A gene cause inherited febrile seizures and GEFS+, type 2.

Patent controversy 

On 29 November 2008, The Sydney Morning Herald reported the first evidence of private intellectual property rights over human DNA having adversely affected medical care. The Melbourne company Genetic Technologies (GTG) controls rights to the gene, and requires royalties for tests on the gene, which can help identify Dravet syndrome. Doctors on the Children's Hospital in Westmead, Australia have told journalists that they would test 50% more infants for the gene, if they could conduct the test on site.

Interactions 

Nav1.1 has been shown to interact with syntrophin, alpha 1.

See also 
 Sodium channel

References

Further reading

External links 
  GeneReviews/NCBI/NIH/UW entry on Familial Hemiplegic Migraine
  GeneReviews/NCBI/NIH/UW entry on SCN1A-Related Seizure Disorders
 

Sodium channels